Erman Kılıç (born 20 September 1983) is a Turkish former professional footballer who played as an attacking midfielder and winger.

Club career
Kılıç began his career with Bergama Belediyespor in 1999. He spent two years with the club before moving to Göztepe in 2001. After two years with the club, he moved to Elazığspor. In 2007, he was transferred to İstanbul Büyükşehir Belediyespor. Sivasspor transferred him in 2009.

Club 
.

Honours

Galatasaray

Turkish Super Cup: 2013

References

External links

1983 births
Living people
People from Erzincan
Turkish footballers
Süper Lig players
Göztepe S.K. footballers
Elazığspor footballers
İstanbul Başakşehir F.K. players
Sivasspor footballers
Galatasaray S.K. footballers
Eskişehirspor footballers
Antalyaspor footballers
24 Erzincanspor footballers
Association football midfielders